Ubari or Awbari (Berber language: Ubari or Awbari) is a Tuareg Berber–speaking oasis town and the capital of the Wadi al Hayaa District, in the Fezzan region of southwestern Libya. It is in the Idehan Ubari, a Libyan section of the Sahara Desert. It was the capital of the former baladiyah (district) called Awbari, in the southwest of the country.

Geography
Ubari is in the Targa valley, lying between the Messak Sattafat plateau and Idhan Ubari erg sand dunes and lakes. Native plants include wetland grasses at the natural spring fed lakes' shorelines, and the native Saharan Date palm (Phoenix dactylifera)

The Ubari oasis settlement is the second center for the Kel Ajjer Tuareg people, after Ghat. Neighbouring villages include Germa, and Garran.

Ubari is located in one of the sunniest and driest areas in the world. It has a hot desert climate (Köppen climate classification BWh) with short, very warm winters but long, extremely hot summers. Average annual rainfall is one of the lowest found on the planet with only 8 mm (0.31 in) and many decades may easily pass without seeing any rainfall at all. Ubari has permanent, unlimited sunshine and clear skies all year round and in all seasons. Clouds are extremely rare over this bone-dry land.  Average high temperatures exceed 40 °C (104 °F) from June to September.

NC186 is an oil field in southwest Ubari, operated by Repsol.

Libyan civil wars
During the 2011 Libyan civil war the town was captured by the forces of the National Transitional Council on 22 September 2011.

On 19 November 2011, Saif al-Islam Gaddafi and a few associates were captured and detained about 50 kilometers west of Ubari as they were trying to flee to neighbouring Niger. Following the 2nd civil war, the city has been claimed by independent Tuareg and Toubou tribes.

See also
Ubari Airport
List of cities in Libya

References

External links

Populated places in Wadi al Hayaa District
Oases of Libya
Tuareg
Baladiyat of Libya
Berber populated places

vi:Ubari